Gavlfjorden is a fjord (more accurately, a sound) in Nordland county, Norway. In the north, the fjord flows out into the Norwegian Sea, and in the south, the fjord splits into the Sortlandssundet strait and the Risøysundet strait.

See also
 List of Norwegian fjords

References

Fjords of Nordland
Øksnes
Andøy
Sortland